Kronholm is a surname. Notable people with the surname include:
Kenneth Kronholm (born 1985), American soccer player
Markus Kronholm (born 1991), Finnish footballer

See also
Cronholm